Val-de-Livenne is a commune in the Gironde department in Nouvelle-Aquitaine in southwestern France. It was established on 1 January 2019 by merger of the former communes of Saint-Caprais-de-Blaye (the seat) and Marcillac.

See also
Communes of the Gironde department

References

Communes of Gironde